Havaco is an unincorporated community on the Tug Fork River in McDowell County, West Virginia, United States.

References

External links
Thunder in the Mountains - The Havaco Story

Unincorporated communities in McDowell County, West Virginia
Unincorporated communities in West Virginia
Coal towns in West Virginia